WJKX (102.5 FM, "102JKX") is a radio station licensed to the community Ellisville, Mississippi, and serving the Laurel-Hattiesburg area.  The station is owned by iHeartMedia and the license is held by iHM Licenses, LLC.  It airs an Urban Adult Contemporary music format.

History
It began in 1973 as WBSJ, a country music station, located just north of Ellisville.  Upon its acquisition by Clear Channel, call letters and format were changed, and the studios moved to Laurel, Mississippi.

The station was assigned the WJKX call letters by the Federal Communications Commission on March 1, 1990.

References

External links
WJKX official website

JKX
Urban adult contemporary radio stations in the United States
Radio stations established in 1973
1973 establishments in Mississippi
IHeartMedia radio stations